Willi Herold (11 September 192514 November 1946), also known as "the Executioner of Emsland," was a German war criminal. Near the end of World War II in Europe, Herold deserted from the German Army and, posing as a Luftwaffe captain, organized the mass execution of German army deserters held at a prison camp. Herold was arrested by British forces and executed for war crimes on 14 November 1946 at Wolfenbüttel prison.

Early life
Herold was born on September 11, 1925, in Lunzenau, a small village in Saxony, Germany. 

He joined the Jungvolk when he was 10 years old in 1935, but was expelled the next year for skipping service and trying to organize his own "pack" of boys, both of which were against the regulations. He then joined the Hitler Youth at the age of fourteen, and for a time he was enthralled by them, thanks to the long nature excursions they took him on and the various benefits they provided. 

After completing his elementary education, he began an apprenticeship as a chimney sweep at the age of fifteen in the neighboring village of Waldheim, from which he eventually ran away with a friend because he didn't feel like working and wanted to emigrate to America. He was apprehended by the Gestapo and sent back to Lunzenau. He completed his apprenticeship in 1943.

He served his Reich Labour Service on the Atlantic Wall in France from June to September 1943, and three weeks after turning eighteen, he joined the army and was deployed to Tangermünde.

Second World War

C. 1943–1944 
On 30 September 1943, Herold entered military service. He was trained as a paratrooper (Fallschirmjäger) in Tangermünde because of his above-average physical fitness. His division was the last to undergo near-full paratrooper training, with three months of infantry training and a sixteen-day parachute course. He was promoted to Lance Corporal after participating in the battles of Nettuno and Monte Cassino in early 1944. He claimed he was awarded the Iron Cross 1st and 2nd Class (for supposedly destroying two British tanks on the beaches of Salerno), the Silver Close Combat Clasp, the Silver Wound Badge, the Parachutist Badge and the Infantry Badge. Records of him ever receiving these medals have not been found so far.

C. 1945 
In March 1945, Herold's unit retreated from the Netherlands to Germany. In the chaos of the retreating German army, Herold became separated from his unit in late March 1945, and he was left to travel by himself on the lengthy route between Gronau and Bad Bentheim. In a shot-up Wehrmacht car that was lying in a ditch on the side of the road, he found the uniform of a highly decorated Luftwaffe Captain and assumed the fictional identity of "Captain Herold of the Sixth Parachute Division."  After convincing a Major he met at a control point in Ochtrup, he received four soldiers under his command. Although he had a core group of twelve people, roughly sixty more would occasionally join him and depart when it was convenient for them. Herold was remarkably only required to provide identification twice despite claiming to be on a special mission from the Führer.

Along with numerous scouting missions, Herold also made numerous attempts to engage the enemy, culminating in him and his men joining the unit stationed close to the village of Lathen, which was occupied by the Allies. However, this effort failed, and he ordered a retreat when he lost too many men to enemy tank fire. Herold started to consider ways to recruit more soldiers as he grew frustrated that he lacked the men and equipment necessary to truly impact the enemy. He encountered local garrison commander Jann Budde in the Surwold village, who informed him that hundreds of former Wehrmacht soldiers were waiting for the war to conclude in the Penal Camp II Aschendorfermoor. Herold discovered a chance to address his personnel issue and made his way to the camp.

On 11 April 1945, Herold's group arrived at the Aschendorfermoor II prison camp (containing mostly German inmates), one of the Emslandlager camps. There, he was asked by one of the camp supervisors, Karl Schütte, to judge a group of 30 inmates which had escaped during a forced march to Collinghorst and had been recaptured. Herold ordered five of the men to be shot, and was eventually stopped by the judicial official Friedrich Hansen, who asked Herold to obtain permission from Dr. Richard Thiel, the head of the central administration of the prison camps. Having failed to obtain permission from Dr. Thiel after a lengthy visit, Herold visited Nazi district leader Gerhard Buscher, who got the Gestapo involved. Through Buscher, the Gestapo granted Herold permission to execute the 30 escaped inmates. Over the next two weeks, Herold would order the execution of not only the 30 escaped inmates, but a large number of political prisoners from a list of 400 names compiled by Dr. Thiel. 

Herold also chose a large number of inmates, equipped them with uniforms and weapons and dispatched them to the town of Leer to join the Wehrmacht, but this plan was ultimately unsuccessful since the troops quickly surrendered to advancing Polish forces. On 19 April 1945, British bomber planes attacked a nearby antiaircraft battery, and a few bombs hit the camp, destroying it completely. 

Herold recruited 12 prisoners and converted them into his bodyguards. They traveled north, terrifying the populace as they went from town to town. They executed five Dutchmen accused of espionage after removing them from a nearby prison, making them dig their own graves, and hanging a farmer who had flown a white flag. He and his men were taken into custody in an Aurich hotel on 30 April. He was put on trial by the authorities on 3 May 1945, but the trial was interrupted and he was conditionally released, thanks to the combined efforts of the Kriegsmarine Chief Justice for the East Frisian region Horst Franke and Admiral Kurt Weyher. Herold was brought to a special unit, where he was warmly welcomed, but he swiftly left under the cover of darkness and traveled to the port city of Wilhelmshaven. Under his true name, he assembled a soldier's paybook and discharge documents before resuming work as a chimney-sweep.

Arrest, trial and execution
Herold was arrested by Royal Navy personnel on 23 May 1945 for the theft of a loaf of bread, and was sent to CIC Esterwegen. During the summer of 1945, the British investigated Herold's crimes, laboring under the initial impression that his victims had been citizens of Allied countries. On 1 February 1946, Herold and 50 other inmates from CIC Esterwegen were forced by the British occupying forces to dig up the remains of the inmates murdered at Aschendorfermoor camp.

A total of 195 bodies were excavated. In August 1946, Herold and 12 others were tried in Oldenburg by the British, overseen by Colonel Herbert Bown. Herold was notable for his apparently relaxed demeanor and lack of remorse. On 29 August 1946, Herold and six other co-defendants: Karl Hagewald, Bernhard Meyer, Karl Schütte, Josef Euler, Hermann Brandt and Otto Paeller, were sentenced to death; Herold in particular was held responsible for the murder of 111 people. On 14 November 1946, Herold and the five other defendants were executed by guillotining by Friedrich Hehr in Wolfenbüttel prison. Herold showed courage and coolness, in contrast to some of his other collaborators, according to the chief interrogator Major Pantcheff, who was present at the execution.

Bibliography

Books
Kurt Buck: In Search of the Moor Soldier. Emslandlager 1933-1945 and the historical places today. 6th, extended edition. Documentation and Information Center Emslandlager, Papenburg 2008, .
TXH Pantcheff: The Executioner of the Emsland. Willi Herold, 19 years old. A German lesson . Bund-Verlag, Cologne 1987,  . (2nd edition as: The Executioner of Emsland: Documentation of a barbarism at the end of the war 1995. Schuster, Leer 1995).
Heinrich and Inge Peters: Pattjackenblut. Dying to die - in line with 5 members. The "Herold Massacre in the Emsland camp II Aschendorfermoor in April 1945". Books on Demand, Norderstedt 2014, .

Film
The Captain - film based on the events surrounding Herold. Directed by Robert Schwentke. Germany 2017.

References

1925 births
1946 deaths
Nazis convicted of war crimes
People from Mittelsachsen
Executed Nazi concentration camp personnel
Nazis executed by the British military by guillotine
German prisoners of war in World War II held by the United Kingdom
German mass murderers
Criminals from Saxony
Hitler Youth members
Reich Labour Service members
German Army soldiers of World War II
Recipients of the Iron Cross (1939), 1st class
Executed mass murderers